The discography of Propaganda (birth name Jason Emmanuel Petty), an American Christian hip hop and spoken word artist and poet from Los Angeles, California, consists of five studio albums, two EPs, twelve compilation appearances, eleven music videos, including one as a featured performer, and twenty-three guest appearances.

Discovered by the underground hip hop collective Tunnel Rats, Petty made his debut in 2002 on Speak Life by Sev Statik. On April 8, 2003, he released his solo debut album, Out of Knowhere, with UpRok Records, and recorded as part of the Tunnel Rats on Underground Rise, Volume 1: Sunrise/Sunset. He then recorded with the Tunnel Rats for the collective's 2004 self-titled album. In 2006, he released the I Am Not Them EP with Tunnel Rat Music and recorded Live This as part of the Tunnel Rats-affiliated group Footsoldiers. Footsoldiers also collaborated with KRS-One on his album Life, with Petty appearing on the song "I Ain't Leaving", and DJ Tony Touch released a mixtape featuring the group. Petty released a second solo EP, The Sketchbook: A Small Collection of Unreleased Material, independently in 2008, and his second album, Listen Watch Focus, also came out in 2008 through End of Earth Records.

Petty's next three albums were all released through the Portland-based Humble Beast Records. The first, entitled Art Ambidextrous, was recorded in collaboration with Odd Thomas, and came out in 2011. Petty's third solo album, Excellent, came out in 2012, and charted at No. 7 on the Billboard Top Gospel chart. Petty's fourth solo album, Crimson Cord came out on April 29, 2014, and charted at No. 5 on the Billboard Top Christian chart, No. 2 on the Top Gospel, and No. 8 on the Top Rap chart.

Albums

Studio albums

Compilation albums

EPs

Guest appearances

Music videos

As lead artist

As featured artist

References

Discographies of American artists
Hip hop discographies
Christian music discographies